David N. Ott (April 29, 1937 – May 31, 2020) was an American politician and lawyer.

Ott was born in Titusville, Pennsylvania. He moved with his family to Pittsburgh, Pennsylvania and graduated from West View High School in 1955. Ott graduated from Bucknell University in 1959. He served in the United States Army and was commissioned a second lieutenant. Ott graduated from Dickinson School of Law in 1969. He moved to York, Maine and was admitted to the Maine bar in 1970. Ott practiced law in York, Maine and served as the town moderator. Ott served in the Maine House of Representatives from 1991 to 1998 and in 2005 and 2006 as a Republican. Ott died in York, Maine.

Notes

1937 births
2020 deaths
Politicians from Pittsburgh
People from Titusville, Pennsylvania
People from York, Maine
Military personnel from Pennsylvania
Bucknell University alumni
Dickinson School of Law alumni
Maine lawyers
Republican Party members of the Maine House of Representatives